Benjamin Bryant Jarrett (July 18, 1881 – July 20, 1944) was a Republican member of the U.S. House of Representatives from Pennsylvania.

Biography
Benjamin Jarrett was born in Sharon, Pennsylvania.  He worked as a telegraph operator and later as foreman in a steel mill.  He studied law, was admitted to the bar in 1907 and commenced practice in Farrell, Pennsylvania.  He was city solicitor of Farrell from 1910 to 1930.  He served in the Pennsylvania State Senate from 1911 to 1913.  He was a member of the Pennsylvania State Workmen's Compensation Board from 1919 to 1923.  He served as chairman of Mercer County, Pennsylvania, Republican committee.

Jarrett was elected as a Republican to the Seventy-fifth, Seventy-sixth, and Seventy-seventh Congresses.  He was not a candidate for renomination in 1942.  He resumed the practice of law, and died, while on a visit to Zanesville, Ohio.  He is buried in Oakwood Cemetery in Sharon, Pennsylvania.

Sources

The Political Graveyard

Republican Party Pennsylvania state senators
1881 births
1944 deaths
Pennsylvania lawyers
Republican Party members of the United States House of Representatives from Pennsylvania
20th-century American politicians
20th-century American lawyers